William Stevenson (3 May 1897 – 26 August 1972) was a Scotland international rugby union player.

Rugby Union career

Amateur career

Stevenson played for Glasgow Academicals.

Provincial career

He played for Glasgow District in the 1924 inter-city match against Edinburgh District.

He played for Whites Trial against Blues Trial on 15 December 1924; and he started for Scotland Possibles in the trial match of 27 December 1924, impressing he came on for the Scotland Probables side in the second half.

International career

Stevenson played for Scotland once in 1925.

Military career

He was in the 3/16 Punjab regiment, and was a captain.

Family

His father Hugh Ferguson Stevenson (1845-1930) married Eliza McEwen (1854-1933) in 1879 in Glasgow.

William was one of their eight children, and the youngest son.

William was to marry Elizabeth Margaret Wallace (1902-1985) in 1931 in Kirkintilloch.

References

1897 births
1972 deaths
Scotland international rugby union players
Scottish rugby union players
Rugby union props
Glasgow Academicals rugby union players
Scotland Possibles players
Scotland Probables players
Whites Trial players
Glasgow District (rugby union) players